The South African Police Service (SAPS) is the national police force of the Republic of South Africa. Its 1,154 police stations in South Africa are divided according to the provincial borders, and a Provincial Commissioner is appointed in each province. The nine Provincial Commissioners report directly to the National Commissioner. The head office is in the Wachthuis Building in Pretoria.

The Constitution of South Africa lays down that the South African Police Service has a responsibility to prevent, combat and investigate crime, maintain public order, protect and secure the inhabitants of the Republic and their property, uphold and enforce the law, create a safe and secure environment for all people in South Africa, prevent anything that may threaten the safety or security of any community, investigate any crimes that threaten the safety or security of any community, ensure criminals are brought to justice and participate in efforts to address the causes of crime.

Amnesty International and others have expressed serious concerns about South African police brutality, including torture and extrajudicial killings.

History

The South African Police Service traces its origin to the Dutch Watch, a paramilitary organisation formed by settlers in the Cape Province in 1655 to protect civilians and to maintain law and order. In 1795, British officials assumed control over the Dutch Watch, and in 1825 established the Cape Constabulary (which became the Cape Town Police Force in 1840). In 1854, a police force was established in Durban which would become the Durban Borough Police, and in 1935 the Durban City Police (DCP). Act 3 of 1855 established the Frontier Armed and Mounted Police Force in the Eastern Cape, restyled as the Cape Mounted Riflemen in 1878.

The South African Police (SAP) was created after the establishment of the Union of South Africa in 1913. Four years later, the Mounted Riflemen's Association relinquished its civilian responsibilities to the SAP as most of its riflemen left to serve in the First World War. The SAP and the military maintained a close relationship even after the SAP assumed permanent responsibility for domestic law and order in 1926. Police officials often called on the army for support in case of emergencies. During the Second World War, one SAP brigade served with the 2nd Infantry Division of the South African Army in North Africa.

When the National Party (NP) edged out its more liberal opponents in nationwide elections in 1948, the new government enacted legislation that strengthened the relationship between the police and the military.  Police subsequently became heavily armed, especially when facing unruly or hostile crowds. The Police Act (No. 7) of 1958 broadened the mission of the SAP beyond conventional police functions, and allowed police to quell civil unrest and conduct counterinsurgency operations. The Police Amendment Act (No. 70) of 1965 allowed police to detain any person, receptacle, vehicle, aircraft, or premise within one mile of any national border, and to seize anything found without a warrant. This search-and-seize zone was extended to within eight miles of any border in 1979 and to the entire country in 1983.

After the end of apartheid, the South African Police was renamed the South African Police Service (SAPS), and the Ministry of Law and Order was renamed the Ministry of Safety and Security, in keeping with these symbolic reforms. The new Minister of Safety and Security, Sydney Mufamadi, obtained police training assistance from Zimbabwe, the United Kingdom and Canada and proclaimed that racial tolerance and human rights would be central to police training in the future. By the end of 1995, the SAPS had incorporated the ten police agencies of the former homelands, and had reorganised at both national and provincial level.

Battle honours 

First World War
South West Africa 1914-1915
German East Africa 1916-18
Second World War
Western Desert 1941-43
Gazala
Bardia
Point 204
Sollum
Halfaya
Commonwealth Keep
Tobruk
Other
 Rhodesia 1967-75

Organisation

Three police unions were active in bargaining on behalf of police personnel and in protecting the interests of the workforce, as of 1996. These are the Police and Prisons Civil Rights Union, which has about 150,000 members; the South African Policing Union (SAPU), which has about 35,000 members; and the Public Service Association (PSA), which has about 4,000 members.

Divisions
South African Police Service headquarters in Pretoria is organised into six divisions: the Crime Combating and Investigation Division, the Visible Policing Division, the Internal Stability Division, the Community Relations Division, the Supporting Services Division, and the Human Resource Management Division.

The Crime Combating and Investigation Division holds overall responsibility for coordinating crime and investigative procedures. It administers the Criminal Record Centre, Commercial Crime Unit, Diamond and Gold Branch, Narcotics Bureau, Stock Theft Unit, the Inspectorate for Explosives, murder and robbery units located in each major city, and vehicle theft units throughout the country. In addition, the division manages the National Bureau of Missing Persons, which was established in late 1994. The Visible Policing Division manages highly public police operations, such as guarding senior government officials and dignitaries. Most government residences are guarded by members of the division's Special Guard Unit. The division's all-volunteer Special Task Force handles hostage situations and other high-risk activities. The Internal Stability Division is responsible for preventing and quelling internal unrest, and for assisting other divisions in combating crime. The Community Relations Division consults with all police divisions concerning accountability and respect for human rights. The Supporting Services Division manages financial, legal, and administrative matters. There is also a large reserve division.

Rank structure
The current ranking system of the South African Police Service was adopted in April 2010. The change caused some controversy as new ranks like "general" and "colonel" have a military connotation. Furthermore, the new rank system mirrors the system used by the South African Police during the apartheid era. In 2009, Deputy Minister of Police Fikile Mbalula spoke of making the police a paramilitary force by changing the SAPS ranking system so that it would closely mirror the military ranking system. This created a significant amount of controversy from people critical of what they called the "militarisation" of the police.

The ranking system was amended in 2016. The role of regional police commissioner was introduced, with the rank of lieutenant general. The major and lieutenant ranks were eliminated, with lieutenants assuming the rank of captain and majors assuming the rank of lieutenant colonel.

National Commissioners

Resources

Vehicles
Through the early-1990s, the police were equipped with smoke and tear-gas dispensing vehicles, tank trucks with water cannons, vehicles that dispensed barbed wire or razor wire to cordon off areas, and a number of rotor and fixed wing aircraft for surveillance, ground force management, rapid deployment of Task Force and specialist teams to crime scenes and VIP personnel movements. The RG-12 'Nyala' is on the most commonly used armoured vehicle of the service. The Casspir Mine-Resistant Ambush Protected Vehicle is another notable vehicle used by the police.

Aviation
, with the arrival of a new helicopter, the SAPS Air Wing operates a fleet of 34 aeroplanes and helicopters. The Air Wing has about 50 pilots and 300 other personnel.

Airplanes
 8 x Pilatus PC-6/B2-H4
 1 x Beech King Air C90A
 1 x Cessna 680 Citation Sovereign
 1 x Pilatus PC-12/47

Helicopters
 14 x Eurocopter AS350 B3
 6 x Robinson R44
 2 x McDonnell-Douglas 369E
 1 x MBB Bk 117B1

Firearms

South African Police Service officers generally carry a Vektor Z88 9mm pistol and pepper spray. Each patrol car is usually also equipped a R5 rifle. To quell disturbances a variety of firearms are used, including R1 semi-automatic rifles, BXP sub-machine gun, Musler 12 gauge shotgun (capable of firing anti-riot rubber bullets contained in standard 12 bore shotgun cartridges), as well as tear gas and pencil flares. The R1 rifle has been withdrawn from all front-line police armories since the mid-1990s, but is still used by elements of the Special Task Force.

Criticism and controversies

Administration
Since the departure of democratic South Africa's first National commissioner George Fivaz in January 2000, a number of successive commissioners have been unable to complete a single term in office, most implicated in and charged with misconduct.

The distribution of personnel has been controversial, with local legislators questioning why areas most in need of policing resources are being neglected. The department was criticised by the Western Cape Government for providing the lowest number personnel (adjusted for population) with a shortage of 2,392 officers, despite having the highest murder rate. This has been the subject of the Khayelitsha Commission.

Brutality and repression

Amnesty International has expressed concerns about police brutality, including torture and extrajudicial killings, in South Africa. There has also been concern about brutal training methods for the police. According to Peter Jordi from the Wits Law Clinic "[Police] Torture is spiralling out of control. It is happening everywhere." Brandon Edmonds argues that "The cops prey on the poor in this country." Independent studies have confirmed that the SAPS has been used to repress peaceful marches. In April 2009, SAPS attempted to ban unFreedom Day and was implicated in support for September 2009 ANC mob that attacked the elected leadership of the shack settlement at Kennedy Road, Durban. Police officers have also been accused of excessive policing in Blikkiesdorp in Delft, Cape Town, by suppression of freedom and ordering illegal curfews.

630 police officers from Gauteng Province were arrested in 2011, for fraud and corruption but also rape and murder. An April 2012 editorial in The Times opined: "It seems torture and outright violation of human rights is becoming the order of the day for some of our police officers and experts warn that the line between criminals and our law enforcement officers is "blurred"."

In February 2013, police in Daveyton, Gauteng were caught on video brutalising Mido Macia, a Mozambican taxi driver accused of parking illegally. Macia was handcuffed to a police van and dragged through the streets, later succumbing to his injuries. Eight police officers were arrested and later convicted of murder.

Three police officers were arrested for the controversial shooting of Nathaniel Julies, a 16 year-old boy with down syndrome, in Eldorado Park.

Marikana massacre

The Marikana Massacre, was a mass shooting that occurred when police broke up a gathering by striking Lonmin workers on a 'koppie' (hilltop) near the Nkaneng shack settlement in Marikana on 16 August 2012. 34 miners were killed and 78 miners injured, causing anger and public outcry, fueled by reports that most of the victims were shot from behind and many shot far from police lines. It later emerged that the violence had actually started on 11 August when leaders from the National Union of Mineworkers opened fire on striking NUM members killing two. It is alleged that police did nothing in the aftermath thereby creating a situation in which workers felt that they would have to use other means to protect themselves. Between 12 and 14 August, approximately 8 more people were killed including two policemen and two security guards. It is the country's deadliest incident between police and the civilian population since the Sharpeville Massacre of 1960, and has been referred to as a turning-point in post-1994 South Africa.

Corruption
On 10 September 2007 an arrest warrant was issued by the National Prosecuting Authority (NPA) for National Police Commissioner Jackie Selebi (Interpol president from 2004 to 2008). On 23 September 2007, President Mbeki suspended NPA Head Vusi Pikoli, allegedly because of "an irretrievable breakdown" in the relationship between Pikoli and Justice Minister Brigitte Mabandla. However, journalists at the Mail and Guardian claim to have solid information supporting the widespread suspicion that President Mbeki suspended Pikoli as part of a bid to shield Police Commissioner Selebi. According to the Mail and Guardian on 5 October 2007 the NPA was investigating Selebi for corruption, fraud, racketeering and defeating the ends of justice.
Selebi was found guilty of corruption in July 2010, but not guilty of further charges of perverting the course of justice.

In February 2011 Bheki Cele was implicated in unlawful conduct and maladministration with a R500m lease agreement for the new police headquarters in Pretoria. In October 2011, President Jacob Zuma announced that Cele had been suspended pending an investigation into the agreement. After recommendation from a board of inquiry, Zuma dismissed Cele and announced that Riah Phiyega, the first female commissioner, would replace him.

In February 2018, SAPS Lieutenant-General Khomotso Phahlane, who was also former acting SAPS Commissioner, and his wife appeared in court on charges of fraud and corruption. On 30 July 2020, Phahlane was dismissed from the police after three years on suspension. The same day, he was found guilty of dishonest conduct.

On 12 July 2019, it was announced the five North West Province police officers were arrested during the week in three separate corruption cases. On 4 June 2020, six senior Gauteng police officers where among 14 people arrested on corruption charges. Two other senior officers, now retired, were arrested as well. Among the Guateng-based SAPS officers charged with corruption included three brigadiers and a retired SAPS Lieutenant General.

On 12 October 2020, Lieutenant-General Bonang Mgwenya, the country’s second-most senior police official, was arrested on charges of corruption, fraud, theft and money laundering involving about R200-million and afterwards appeared in Ridge Magistrates’ court. At the time of Mgwenya's arrest, she and Phahlane were among 14 fellow officers who were charged with corruption. Mgwenya was suspended on 15 October 2020 and was dismissed from SAPS on 13 November 2020.

On 23 December 2020, four Cape Town police officers attached to the national border control unit at Cape Town International Airport were arrested for extorting money from Chinese businesses. On December 28, 2020, three law enforcement officers who were employed by the Emalahleni Municipality were arrested in Mpumalanga on corruption and bribery charges which involved allegations of not issuing standard fines to motorists who committed traffic violations, but instead extorting them for bribes.

Two criminal charges were lodged by the Independent Police Investigative Directorate against the National Police Commissioner Khehla Sitole for refusing to cooperate with its investigation into the murder of Charl Kinnear. Kinnear was a police intelligence officer investigating organised crime within the SAPS.

Image

On December 23, 2020, Peter Ntsime, the Acting Deputy General Secretary of South African Policing Union (SAPU), declared that the image of SAPS was tainted the previous day when Colonel Kamelash Dalip Singh, a senior SAPU policeman from the KwaZulu-Natal Provincial Anti-Corruption Unit, was arrested, and then released on bail, on a bribe charge. Ntsime criticized the arrest, stating Singh was at the forefront of arresting crooked police officers and was onto a big syndicate. Despite a statement from Directorate for Priority Crime Investigation (Hawks) spokesperson Captain Simphiwe Mhlongo that uncover Hawks officers caught Singh red-handed accepting a R5,000 bribe, people took to social media to criticize his arrest as well.

On December 24, 2020, a video was published showing passengers on a minibus taxi cheering on their driver as he brawled with a police officer in Cape Town following a vehicle crash. Despite the fact that the taxi driver delivered more punches, and also spit in the officer's face after the officer attempted to deliver the first punch, the officer was arrested after a test confirmed he driving under the influence of alcohol, and was also charged reckless and negligent driving. On December 15, 2020, it was that at least one Cape Town-area officer stationed in Durbanville had been using taxis to illegally sell alcohol.

Notes

References

See also
 South African Police Service Occult-related Crimes Unit
 Hawks ( Directorate for Priority Crime Investigation / SAPS)
 South African Police Service Special Task Force
 Political repression in post-apartheid South Africa

External links

 South African Police Service
 South African Police Officers Memorial
 Directory of police stations in South Africa

1995 establishments in South Africa
Crime in South Africa
Government agencies established in 1995
National law enforcement agencies of South Africa